The Lotus Pond is a 2011 Indian film based on boarding school life and an adventure drama film written, and directed by P.G. Vinda. It was selected for the Competition Section of the 17th International Children's Film Festival. Andhra Pradesh government has exempted the film from entertainment tax.

Cast 
Akash Puri as Neeraj 
Rohit Rankha as Ajay
Harsh Khurana as Choudary
Swati chandel as Sheela
Karan Sehagal as Khemu
Ramavtar Yadav as School Principal

References

External links
 

2011 films